JCLC may refer to:

Jefferson County Library Cooperative
Journal of Criminal Law & Criminology